John H. Clark (May 18, 1849 in Oughterard, County Galway – July 26, 1922 in Philadelphia, Pennsylvania) was an Irish-American boxer. He was born in Oughterard, County Galway, but spent most of childhood in England before moving to the United States. Clark was a clog and jig dancer before pursuing a career in prize-fighting. He was the Lightweight Champion of America for two streaks before losing to Arthur Chambers in 1879 following a 136-round bout. He owned a billiard hall and boxing school in Philadelphia.

External links
Clark's Record at Cyber Boxing Zone

See also
List of bare-knuckle boxers

References

1849 births
1922 deaths
19th-century Irish people
Bare-knuckle boxers
Irish male boxers
Irish emigrants to the United States (before 1923)
Irish expatriates in the United States
Boxers from Philadelphia
Sportspeople from County Galway
American male boxers
Lightweight boxers